Sjogren Glacier is a glacier  long in the south part of Trinity Peninsula, flowing southeast from Detroit Plateau in between Aldomir Ridge and Hazarbasanov Ridge to enter Prince Gustav Channel at the head of Sjögren Inlet, west of Royak Point. Discovered in 1903 by the Swedish Antarctic Expedition under Nordenskjold. He named it Sjogren Fiord after a patron of the expedition. The true nature of the feature was determined by the Falkland Islands Dependencies Survey (FIDS) in 1945.

Mapped from surveys by Falkland Islands Dependencies Survey (FIDS) (1960–61). The glacier tongue was an extension of the flow of Sjogren Glacier from which it took its name. As a result of glacier withdrawal, it has disappeared since at least 1994, with its area now covered by the Prince Gustav Channel.

See also
 List of glaciers in the Antarctic
 Glaciology

References

External links
 SCAR Composite Antarctic Gazetteer

Glaciers of Trinity Peninsula